Baby Makin' Project is the sixth studio album by American group Jagged Edge. It was released through So So Def Recordings and Island Records on September 25, 2007 in the United States. Chiefly produced by longtime collaborator Jermaine Dupri and co-producer Manuel Seal, Jagged Edge also worked with musicians Selasi, Sick Cents, Tha Corna Boyz and Crackpot on the album.  Following its release, Baby Makin' Project debuted at number eight on the US Billboard 200, selling about 78,000 copies in its first week. The song "Put a Little Umph in It" featuring singer Ashanti served as the first single off the album and peaked at number 49 on the Billboard Hot R&B/Hip-Hop Songs chart.

Track listing 

 Notes 
  signifies co-producer

Charts

Weekly charts

Year-end charts

References 

2007 albums
Jagged Edge (American group) albums
Albums produced by Jermaine Dupri